Amaliënstein is a former mission station of the Berlin Missionary Society, 22 km east of Ladismith, on the road to Calitzdorp. Named after Amalie von Stein, benefactress of German missions. The church complex was completed in 1853.

References

Populated places in the Kannaland Local Municipality